KKRZ (100.3 MHz) is a commercial FM radio station in Portland, Oregon, known as Z100.  It is owned by iHeartMedia and airs a Top 40 (CHR) radio format.  The studios and offices are on SW 68th Parkway in Tigard.  Z100 carries two syndicated shows on weekdays, "Johnjay and Rich" in morning drive time and Ryan Seacrest in middays. Local DJs are heard in the afternoon and evening.

KKRZ has an effective radiated power of 100,000 watts, the maximum for most American FM stations.  The transmitter is in Portland's West Hills, off NW Skyline Boulevard.  KKRZ broadcasts using HD Radio technology.  Its HD-2 digital subchannel carries an alternative rock format known as "Alt 102.3."  That signal feeds 99-watt FM translator K272EL at 102.3 MHz.

History

KGW-FM, KQFM
It originally broadcast on 95.3 MHz. KGW-FM moved to 100.3 MHz, on September 22, 1947. It mostly simulcast its AM counterpart, 620 KGW (now KPOJ). The two stations were owned by Portland's top daily newspaper, The Oregonian. KGW-AM-FM were network affiliates of the NBC Red Network, carrying its dramas, comedies, news, sports, soap operas, game shows and big band broadcasts during the "Golden Age of Radio."

The call sign changed to KQFM on December 1, 1954.  At first, KQFM aired a "good music" format of softer popular songs.  This evolved over time to an easy listening format known as "Q-Music."  The station played mostly instrumental cover versions of popular songs, as well as Broadway and Hollywood showtunes.

In 1978, KQFM switched to a progressive rock sound under the name "Q-100".  The following year, the station was acquired by Golden West Broadcasting, owned by singer-actor Gene Autry.  Golden West already owned KEX, so the two stations were managed and operated together.  KQFM's format was changed to oldies on March 16, 1981 as "Solid Gold FM-100."

Z100
On November 2, 1983, the station changed to the KKRZ call letters and switched to a Hot Adult Contemporary format as "The Rose," playing off of Portland's nickname as "The Rose City."  KKRZ began its current Top 40 format on March 16, 1984, widely mirroring co-owned WHTZ in New York City (including the moniker familiar "Z100" name).

In 1986, the station adopted a more rhythmic-leaning format due to the lack of an existing urban contemporary station in Portland. In 1999, KKRZ picked up competition from Adult Contemporary-formatted KXL-FM, who flipped to rhythmic CHR, becoming KXJM, "Jammin 95.5." This competition between the two would last for nine years, as KXJM (whose playlist favored Hip-Hop/R&B and some Dance product) would overtake KKRZ (who shifted back to a more mainstream direction) in the Portland Arbitrons.

KXJM saw its ratings decline by 2007 and switched to Sports Talk as KXTG in May 2008. In response, KKRZ would add more Rhythmic crossovers to its playlist again, but later faced new competition from CBS Radio outlet KVMX, who dropped its Rhythmic Adult Contemporary format and picked up KXJM's Rhythmic CHR format and intellectual property, including the KXJM call letters and "Jammin'" branding, from Rose City Radio Corporation, the owners of KXTG.  KKRZ's playlist later returned to the center and became a more balanced Top 40/CHR.

Clear Channel ownership
On April 1, 2009, Clear Channel Communications took over ownership of KXJM from CBS, thus making KKRZ and KXJM sister stations.  At first, both stations retained their respective formats.  In March 2010, KXJM relaunched as "WiLD 107.5", but kept its Rhythmic Top 40 format. Despite the fact that both KKRZ and KXJM are under the same ownership, and being programmed by the same program director, KKRZ continues to focus on Mainstream Pop/Rock hits.

On September 16, 2014, Clear Channel renamed itself iHeartMedia, to bring its corporate name in line with its iHeartRadio internet platform.

Morning Shows
Z100 has had several noteworthy morning shows in its history. The "Z Morning Zoo" started in 1984 (the year Z100 signed on), and had multiple hosts and cohosts over the years.  These included Gary Bryan, Dan Clark, John Murphy, Tony Martinez, Nelson the Intern, Scott Thrower, Billy Hayes, Valerie Ring and Brooke Belson.  The Z Morning Zoo lasted until 2000, when it was replaced with "Chet & Nicole."

They lasted until 2002, when "The BuckHead Show" debuted, which lasted about five years.  In the same week that BuckHead received the Edison Media Top 30 Under 30 Personality Award, KKRZ management Brian Bridgman, Tony Coles and Robert Dove began running short, cryptic spots about "T-Man" coming to Portland.  On August 31, 2007, BuckHead's morning fill-in host Brooke Fox announced that indeed, "The T-Man Show" was coming to Z100 mornings on Tuesday, September 4, 2007. The T-Man Show was based in Seattle at co-owned KUBE and was also syndicated in San Francisco at iHeart-owned KYLD.

Less than six months later, the T-Man show was pulled from KKRZ, for undisclosed reasons (presumably due to low ratings). The T-Man could still be heard in Seattle and San Francisco until the show ended in 2009. The Johnjay and Rich Show, based at iHeart's KZZP Phoenix, began airing on KKRZ in 2008.

Programming
In addition to the morning show, KKRZ's weekday lineup include On Air with Ryan Seacrest in middays, Maui in early afternoons, Zann in afternoon drive time and Jake B. in the evening. Other personalities include Kayla, Sos and Matt Holiday. Weekends feature American Top 40 with Ryan Seacrest, the iHeartRadio Countdown, On The Move with Enrique Santos, Most Requested Live with Romeo and The Vibe with Tanya and EJ.  Weather reports are provided by ABC affiliate KATU, and traffic reports are supplied by sister station KEX.

HD Radio
KKRZ broadcasts in the HD Radio format.  KKRZ-HD2 airs alternative rock, branded as "Alt 102.3."  It is simulcast on 99-watt FM translator K272EL at 102.3 MHz.  On weekday mornings, Alt 102.3 carries "The Woody Show" from KYSR Los Angeles.

References

External links
Z100's website

KRZ
Contemporary hit radio stations in the United States
Radio stations established in 1946
1946 establishments in Oregon
IHeartMedia radio stations